Rainbow Centre Factory Outlet was an enclosed outlet mall in downtown Niagara Falls, New York, that operated from July 2, 1982 to September 30, 2000. Its design was unusual in that it was contained within its own parking ramp, and opened directly into the now-demolished Wintergarden indoor botanical garden on its southern end. It was built, owned, and managed by the Cordish Company until October 2010, when CEO David Cordish personally donated the abandoned mall to Niagara County Community College for use as a culinary institute, student-run restaurant, and a Barnes & Noble bookstore. The Institute and bookstore opened in 2012.

History
The mall opened on July 2, 1982, as part of a failed Urban Renewal project. Initially, the mall was successful, but it did not turn a profit until 1990, when the original anchor, Beir's Department Store, was replaced with a Burlington Coat Factory and the majority of the mall tenants were replaced with outlet stores. The mall was a popular destination during downtown Niagara Falls' Festival of Lights throughout the 1980s and 1990s. However, by the late 1990s, The mall lost its designation as the most successful in Niagara Falls as the Fashion Outlets of Niagara Falls renovated and became the more popular choice. The Rainbow Centre had received no updating since its opening, and simply could not compete with the Fashion Outlets. Burlington Coat Factory closed in 1999, and the entire mall closed in 2000, with all remaining tenants required to evacuate by September of that year. Shortly after closing, the Cordish Co. claimed the mall would be redeveloped into an entertainment complex, but these plans never came to fruition. Despite the closure of all the retail stores in 2000, the mall still remained open to foot traffic for a few years afterward due to the mall's off-track betting parlor remaining successful. Once the center closed in 2005, the mall was officially closed off to all foot traffic and fell into disrepair.  The interior of the mall was gutted in 2011 and the NCCC Culinary Institute and Barnes & Noble opened in the Southern 1/3 of the building on August 31, 2012. The other 2/3 of the structure were turned over to the city of Niagara Falls for future redevelopment. As of 2015 a resort named "Wonderfalls" is planned for the remaining space but development is not yet underway.

References

2000 disestablishments in New York (state)
Defunct shopping malls in the United States
Outlet malls in the United States
Shopping malls in New York (state)
Shopping malls established in 1982
Shopping malls disestablished in 2000
Buildings and structures in Niagara County, New York
The Cordish Companies
American companies disestablished in 2000
American companies established in 1982